Texarkana College is a public community college in Texarkana, Texas.

History
Texarkana College was formed in 1927, as a branch of the Texarkana Independent School District, which voted to proceed with plans for establishment of a community college.  Its first building was located at the corner of 16th and Pine Streets, and contained classrooms, laboratories, and a gymnasium, the latter two of which were used by both the college and the high school.

In 1941, the citizens of Texarkana voted to create a separate Texarkana College District, complete with approval of a $20 mill property tax to fund the District.  However, the local school board and the district's Board of Regents would comprise the same individuals until 1957, when the two boards voted to separate. After a successful bond issue in 1948, the college purchased  at its present location, and moved there in October 1951.

In 1971, Texarkana College and East Texas State University joined to offer upper-level and graduate courses on the Texarkana College campus, whereby Texarkana College students could obtain Bachelor's and Master's degrees without leaving Texarkana.  In 1976, Texarkana College deeded  to ETSU to build an administration building.  The ETSU-Texarkana campus would later become a separately accredited institution and is today's Texas A&M University-Texarkana, and would later relocate to a separate facility.

The Seal of Texarkana College was designed by former instructor Richmond White. Encircling the star of Texas is the live oak branch symbolizing strength and grandeur and the laurel branch representing honor and peace. The year of 1927 is written above the star of Texas to represent the year that Texarkana College was established.

Campus
Texarkana College is located in the northeast border of Texarkana, Texas, at the junction of Robison and Tucker streets, which is approximately one mile south of Interstate 30.

Organization and administration 
Past presidents of Texarkana College include Dr. Henry W. Stilwell, Dr. W.H. Hinton, William P. Akin, Dr. J.W. Cady, Dr. Carl M. Nelson, Frank Coleman, Dr. Alan Rasco and Dr. James Henry Russell.

Student life

Clubs
 Baptist Student Ministries (BSM)
 Black Student Association (BSA)
 Criminal Justice Club
 Cultural Awareness Student Association (TC-CASA)
 Future Chefs Association
 Gaming Club (TC-GC)
 Honors and Leadership Program
 Journalism Club
 Phi Beta Lambda (PBL)
 Phi Theta Kappa
 Student Government Association (SGA)
 STEM Club
 TC Creative Writing Club
 TC Players
 TC Student Nursing Association
 The TC News
 Intramurals

Sports 
In 2012, Texarkana College had to shut down its athletic teams because of a financial crisis. The college teams were known as the Bulldogs.

Notable people
A notable alumnus of Texarkana College is businessman and politician H. Ross Perot, also serving as President of the Student Council. Hunter Pence is a baseball player for the San Francisco Giants and formerly the Houston Astros and Philadelphia Phillies.
Tracy Lawrence, a famous country singer, also attended TC.

References

External links
 Official website

 
Community colleges in Texas
Texarkana, Texas
Buildings and structures in Bowie County, Texas
Education in Bowie County, Texas
Universities and colleges accredited by the Southern Association of Colleges and Schools
Educational institutions established in 1927
1927 establishments in Texas